Rolf Dagfinn Groven (born March 11, 1943) is a Norwegian painter, known for his satirical art painted in figurative style. Groven's paintings are frequently printed works of art in textbooks used in Norwegian schools, as well as history books.

Biography
Groven was born in Romsdal near Molde during the Second World War, and trained as an architect at the Norwegian Institute of Technology (NTH, now a part of NTNU) 1966–72. His participation in the radical Anti-Vietnam War movement convinced him that he should choose an artistic career. He  lives in Oslo.

Common themes
There have been several common themes in his art, ranging from environmentalism, to the European Union, as well as the peace movement and politics. Frequent motifs are religion and scenes from the Romsdal and Lofoten areas of Norway.

Among his environmentally themed works, Groven created several works in the 1970s that propagated the nature conservation. Much of his artwork commented on the fear that the Norway's newly-won status as a petroleum-producing country would lead to excessive pollution. He also commented on the dangers of nuclear power and he agitated for the preservation of waterfalls.

His politically charged works include European Union, for which Norway has held two referendums about joining. The paintings Norwegian Neo Romanticism from 1972 and Free Flow from 1992 were among the best-known symbols of the popular anti EU-accession movement before these referendums. Groven has also commented on American President Donald Trump's 2016 victory.

Groven's art is influenced by painters such as Rembrandt van Rijn, Käthe Kollwitz, as well as Norwegian artists such as Adolph Tidemand, Hans Gude, J.C. Dahl, Christian Krohg and the contemporary caricaturist Finn Graff.

Selected works
 1972 Norwegian Neo Romanticism (a.k.a. Willoch and Bratteli). 
 1973 Liberty Leading the People. Parody of Eugène Delacroix's Liberty Leading the People with a female Viet Cong soldier personifying Liberty.   
 1975 "Oil Painting". Parody of one of Norway's best-known paintings from the 19th century Tidemand and Gude: Bridal Party in Hardanger, 1848
 1977 The nuclear power kid 50,000 reproductions of this poster were printed in the 70s and 80s.
 1978 West coast girl gutting fish (Vestlandsjente). Acquired by the National gallery of Norway. 
 1981 Retribution. Showing a Palestinian crucified as Christ and Menachem Begin as a Christ-killer. 
 1996 Women by church
 2004 Molde as combat zone Historical recreation of wartime events April 29, 1940.

External links
 Website displaying 110 works (Text in Norwegian)
 Artists CV (Text in Norwegian)
 Stephanie Haas: Can Art Influence Political Policy on the Environment? A Case Study Examining Rolf Groven's Eco-Art (Master thesis, PDF)

References

1943 births
Living people
20th-century Norwegian painters
Norwegian male painters
21st-century Norwegian painters
20th-century Norwegian male artists
21st-century Norwegian male artists